Frye Cove is a bay in the U.S. state of Washington.

Frye Cove was named after George W. Frye, a local landowner.

Thurston County Parks board operates the Frye Cove Park on the coast adjacent to the cove. Amenities include a public beach and playground.

References

Landforms of Thurston County, Washington
Bays of Washington (state)